Luv or LUV may refer 
to:

Films and television
Luv (TV series), a BBC sitcom
Luv (play), a Broadway play and 1967 film
Luv (film), 1967 film
LUV (film), 2012 film

Music
Luv (group), a Korean pop group
Luv', a Dutch pop group 
Lil Uzi Vert (born 1994), American rapper
Luv (album), a 2017 album by Luna Sea
"LUV" (A Pink song), a song by Apink
"Luv" (Janet Jackson song), a 2008 song by Janet Jackson
"Luv" (Tory Lanez song), a 2016 song by Tory Lanez
"Luv", a song by Zion I from True & Livin'
"Luv", a song by Travis
"L.U.V" (BtoB song), a 2016 song by BtoB
 "L.U.V.", a song by Charlie Puth

Other
Chevrolet LUV, a light utility vehicle
CIELUV, the CIE 1976 L*, u*, v* color space
Dumatubin Airport (IATA code), Langgur, Kai Islands, Indonesia
Lava (Ramayana) or Luv, son of Hindu god Rama
Linux Users of Victoria
Large unilamellar vesicle (LUV), a type of liposome
LUV, the New York Stock Exchange symbol of Southwest Airlines
Luv, a character in Blade Runner 2049

See also
Light utility vehicle (disambiguation)
Love (disambiguation)
Luvs diapers